Sir Pyers Charles Mostyn, 10th Baronet (1895 – 16 January 1917) was an English baronet.

He was born in 1895, the fourth child and eldest son of Sir Pyers William Mostyn, 9th Baronet. On his own death the title passed to his cousin, Sir Pyers George Joseph Mostyn, 11th Baronet. His death at a young age forced the sale of the family estate of Talacre.

References
Obituary: p. 155, The Annual Register: a review of public events at home and abroad, for the year 1917. London: Longmans, Green and Co. 1918.

1895 births
1917 deaths
Baronets in the Baronetage of England